Selectivity (electronic) may refer to:
 Selectivity (radio), a measure of the performance of a radio receiver to respond only to the radio signal it is tuned
 Selectivity (circuit breakers), the coordination of overcurrent protection devices in an electrical installation